James R. Drake (December 2, 1944 – January 10, 2022) was an American film and television director.

Drake's career began in 1974, working as an associate director for the Norman Lear-produced sitcoms All in the Family and Good Times; he made his lead directorial debut in the syndicated comedy/soap opera spoof series Mary Hartman, Mary Hartman, which was executive produced by Lear. His other television works include Sanford, Gimme a Break!, We Got It Made, The Facts of Life, Newhart, Night Court, The Golden Girls, Dave's World, The Suite Life of Zack & Cody, its spin-off, The Suite Life on Deck, and other series.

His film credits include Mr. Bill's Real Life Adventures, Police Academy 4: Citizens on Patrol and Speed Zone starring John Candy.

Drake was an alumnus of Columbia University and Stanford University. He died in Freeland, Washington, on January 10, 2022, at the age of 77.

References

External links
 

1944 births
2022 deaths
Place of birth missing
American film directors
American television directors
Columbia University alumni
Comedy film directors
Stanford University alumni